John Mueller Anderson (July 29, 1914 – December 3, 1999) was an American philosopher. He was known for his expertise on post-Kantian philosophy, philosophy of art and logic.
Anderson was Evan Pugh Professor of Philosophy at the Pennsylvania State University.

Early life and education
Anderson received a Bachelor of Arts (1935) and a Master of Arts (1936) from the University of Illinois at Urbana–Champaign and a Doctor of Philosophy (1939) at the University of California, Berkeley.

Books

 Discourse on thinking
 Natural deduction :the logical basis of axiom systems
 The individual and the new world 
 The realm of art
 The Truth of Freedom: An Essay on Mankind
 Industrial management

References

1999 deaths
1914 births
20th-century American philosophers
Phenomenologists
Continental philosophers
Philosophy academics
Heidegger scholars
Pennsylvania State University faculty
University of Illinois Urbana-Champaign alumni
University of California, Berkeley alumni
Philosophers of art
American logicians